The aparima or Kaparima (Rarotongan) is a dance from Tahiti and the Cook Islands where the mimicks (apa) with the hands (rima) are central, and as such it is close to the hula or Tongan tauolunga. It is usually a dance for groups.
There are two types of aparima: the aparima hīmene (sung handdance) and the aparima vāvā (silent handdance), the latter being performed with music only, and no singing. The music is often played on the guitar or the Tahitian ukulele.

The stories depicted by the dance are taken from daily traditional occupations or ancient myths.

Unlike the other Tahitian dances, this one is more often performed with the dancers dressed in pāreu and maro. It can also (especially the aparima vāvā) be performed seated, much like the Tongan māuluulu.

References
Patrick O'Reilly; La danse à Tahiti (unclear ref)

Dances of Tahiti